What's Within is a 2014 Nigerian drama film directed and written by Rukky Sanda.

Plot 
This movie is about two young men who have decided to sleep with many woman at their youth which comes with its twist and turn.

Cast 

 Joseph Benjamin 
Alexx Ekubo
 Bolanle Ninalowo 
 Princess Peters
Rukky Sanda

References 

2014 films
Nigerian drama films
2010s English-language films
English-language Nigerian films